Derrick Otanga is Kenyan striker currently in the ranks of Libyan Premier League side Alittihad Misurata SC.

Otanga formerly turned out for Kenyan Premier League sides SoNy Sugar F.C. Wazito F.C. and his immediate former club KCB FC before heading to Libya.

References

External links
 
 
 Derrick Otanga at Football Critic

1996 births
Living people
Kenyan footballers
SoNy Sugar F.C. players
Wazito F.C. players
Kenyan Premier League players